The Kobelco Kobe Steelers are a Japanese rugby union team owned by Kobe Steel, and based in Kobe. They were the first ever Top League champions when the League started in the 2003-2004 season. The team rebranded as Kobelco Kobe Steelers ahead of the rebranding of the Top League to the Japan Rugby League One in 2022.

Honours
 Top League:
 Champions: 2003–04, 2018-19

Personnel

Current management team

Current squad

The current Kobelco Kobe Steelers squad for the 2023 season is:

 * denotes players qualified to play for the Japan on dual nationality or residency grounds.

Past players 
Yuta Imamura (2007-19, 124 games) Centre, Japanese international (2006-13, 39 caps)
Itaru Taniguchi (2008-21, 148 games) Loose forward, Japanese international (2010-11, 10 caps)
Shoji Ito (2009-18, 104 games) Lock, Japanese international (2012-15, 36 caps)

Japanese players
 Toshiyuki Hayashi
 Ian Williams
 Seiji Hirao
 Yuya Saito
 Kensuke Iwabuchi
 Daisuke Ohata
 Andrew Miller
 Atsushi Oyagi
 Kensuke Iwabuchi

Foreign players
 Brodie Retallick
 Andy Ellis
 Dan Carter
 Adam Ashley-Cooper
 Aaron Cruden
 Andries Bekker
 Jacque Fourie 
 Ron Cribb
 Dave Bickle
 Mark Egan
 Simon Wensley
 Pierre Hola
 Peter Grant
 Thinus Delport
 Ben Smith
 Lukhanyo Am
 Hayden Parker

References

External links 
 Steelers upset Green Rockets in Microsoft Cup - Japan Times, January 24, 2005
 Kobelco Steelers official site
 Top League official site

Japan Rugby League One teams
Sports teams in Kobe
Rugby in Kansai
Rugby clubs established in 1928
1928 establishments in Japan